Broken Falls is a waterfall in Grand Teton National Park in the U.S. state of Wyoming. The waterfall descends  over seven drops on the eastern flank of Teewinot Mountain in the Teton Range and then flows into Moose Pond near Jenny Lake.

References 

Waterfalls of Grand Teton National Park
Waterfalls of Wyoming